William W. O'Brien (born July 27, 1969) is an American politician and a Democratic member of the Rhode Island House of Representatives representing District 54 since January 1, 2013.

Education
O'Brien attended Florida International University, Providence College, the University of Rhode Island, and earned his BS in mathematics from Rhode Island College.

Elections
2012 When District 54 Democratic Representative Gregory Schadone retired and left the seat open, O'Brien ran in the three-way September 11, 2012 Democratic Primary, winning with 868 votes (40.4%) and won the November 6, 2012 General election with 3,356 votes (55.7%) against Independent candidate Kenneth Amoriggi.
2010 O'Brien initially challenged District 54 Democratic Representative Schadone in the September 23, 2010 Democratic Primary, but lost to Representative Schadone, who won re-election in the November 2, 2010 General election against Independent candidate Lance Mantia.

References

External links
Official page at the Rhode Island General Assembly
Campaign site

William O'Brien at Ballotpedia
William W. O'Brien at the National Institute on Money in State Politics

Place of birth missing (living people)
1969 births
Living people
Florida International University alumni
Democratic Party members of the Rhode Island House of Representatives
People from North Providence, Rhode Island
Providence College alumni
Rhode Island College alumni
University of Rhode Island alumni
21st-century American politicians